Annabel Venning is a British author and journalist. She was educated at Sherborne School for Girls and University College, Durham. After working at the Daily Mail in London, she left to write Following the Drum: The Lives of Army Wives and Daughters Past and Present (2005).

Venning is the granddaughter of General Sir Walter Walker, a senior British soldier in the post-World War II period. Her father, Richard Venning, was a lieutenant-colonel of the 2nd King Edward VII's Own Gurkha Rifles (The Sirmoor Rifles).

Venning is married to British author Guy Walters; the couple have two children. The family live in Wiltshire.

Bibliography
Following the Drum (2005),

References

1973 births
Living people
British journalists
Alumni of University College, Durham